Arthur Stanley Newens (4 February 1930 – 2 March 2021) was a British Labour Co-operative politician. He was a Member of Parliament (MP) from 1964 to 1970 and 1974 to 1983, and a Member of the European Parliament (MEP) from 1984 to 1999.

Born in Bethnal Green, Newens was educated at Buckhurst Hill County High School. He died in March 2021 at the age of 91.

Career

Newens was a conscientious objector during National Service and worked as a coalminer in Staffordshire. He graduated in History from University College London, and became a schoolteacher. In 1949 he joined the Labour Party, and was still a member. At UCL, he met Anil Moonesinghe, a Sri Lankan Trotskyist, who was later to become a Cabinet Minister in Sri Lanka, and joined the Socialist Review Group led by Tony Cliff, a former member of the Revolutionary Communist Party (RCP), which later became the Socialist Workers Party (SWP); he left this group in 1959. He held several posts in the National Union of Teachers and was chairman of the Movement for Colonial Freedom and president of the London Co-operative Society.

Newens subsequently represented two Essex constituencies as a Labour MP. He was elected for Epping in 1964, and lost the seat in 1970. In 1974, he became the first MP for Harlow, but lost the seat in the Conservative landslide of 1983. Following this, he became an MEP for the London Central constituency in 1984, which he served until 1999. He stood for Harlow again in 1987, but was not successful in being re-elected to the House of Commons.

He held several senior positions, including Vice Chair of the PLP Foreign Affairs Group and Chair and Deputy Leader of the Labour Group of MEPs. He was generally seen as a prominent left-winger, campaigning against the Vietnam War and for other international causes.

Other work

Newens was an active trade unionist, and wrote numerous pamphlets and books, including The Case Against Nato (1972), Third World: Change or Chaos (1977), A History of Struggle: 50th Anniversary of Liberation, formerly the Movement for Colonial Freedom (2004) and Nicolae Ceausescu: The Man, His Ideas and His Socialist Achievements (1972). He was also a local historian of Essex and East London; his book "A History of North Weald Bassett and Its People" was published in 1985, and his study of writer Arthur Morrison was published in Loughton in 2008.

His autobiography, In Quest of a Fairer Society: My Life and Politics, was published in November 2013 by The Memoir Club.

Publications
 Talking with Nicolae Ceaușescu : an interview with Stan Newens (1982). London : London Co-operative Society Political Committee.
 Nicolae Ceaușescu: the man, his ideas and his socialist achievements (1972). Presented by Stan Newens. Nottingham : Bertrand Russell Peace Foundation.
 The case against N.A.T.O.: the danger of the nuclear alliances (1972). London.
 A history of North Weald Bassett and its people (1985). Stan Newens. North Weald : Nuclear Printing Co.
 Nicolae Ceaușescu: The Man, his ideas, and his Socialist Achievements (1972). Stan Newens. Spokesman Books.
 The memoirs of an old East-Ender Arthur Ernest Newens (1899-1977); edited with an introduction by Stan Newens. (2006). Harlow : A.S. Newens.
 Working together : a short history of the London Co-op Society Political Committee (1988). Stan Newens. London : CRS London Political Committee.
 Arthur Morrison : the novelist of realism in East London and Essex (2008). Stan Newens. Loughton : Alderton.
 The Kurds - a people's struggle for peace and justice (1994). Liberation.
 Leah Manning (1991). Ron Bill and Stan Newens. Harlow : Leah Manning Trust in association with Square One Books.

Notes

References 

1930 births
2021 deaths
Anti–Vietnam War activists
British conscientious objectors
British socialists
Alumni of University College London
Labour Co-operative MPs for English constituencies
National Union of Teachers-sponsored MPs
People educated at Buckhurst Hill County High School
People from Bethnal Green
Revolutionary Communist Party (UK, 1944) members
Socialist Workers Party (UK) members
UK MPs 1964–1966
UK MPs 1966–1970
UK MPs 1974
UK MPs 1974–1979
UK MPs 1979–1983
Labour Party (UK) MEPs
MEPs for England 1984–1989
MEPs for England 1989–1994
MEPs for England 1994–1999
Schoolteachers from London
British coal miners